Heathfield Harman "HH" Stephenson (3 May 1833 in Esher, Surrey – 17 December 1896 in Uppingham, Rutland) was a famous English cricketer during the game's roundarm era.

Stephenson bowled right-arm fast roundarm, batted right-handed and was an occasional wicket-keeper.

His known first-class career spanned the 1853 to 1871 seasons.  He took 303 wickets in 256 matches at 16.37 with a best analysis of 8/28.  He had 17 5wI and 4 10wM.  He scored 7360 runs at 17.90 with a highest score of 119, making 3 centuries.  He took 152 catches and made 25 stumpings.

HH Stephenson was the first cricketer to be awarded a hat for taking three wickets in consecutive balls, the origin of the hat-trick.  He performed the feat for the All-England Eleven against the twenty-two of Hallam at the Hyde Park ground, Sheffield in 1858.  A collection was held for Stephenson (as was customary for outstanding feats by professionals) and he was presented with a cap or hat bought with the proceeds.

At the end of the 1859 English cricket season, Stephenson was one of the 12 players who took part in cricket's first-ever overseas tour when an England cricket team led by George Parr visited North America.

In the 1861-62 Australian cricket season, Stephenson captained the England team put together by Messrs Spiers and Pond that made the inaugural tour of Australia. The team travelled to Australia on the SS Great Britain. He is the first player featured on a mural in the Melbourne Cricket Ground (MCG) pavilion showing many of the famous cricketers who have played on that ground.

Stephenson was an occasional umpire after his playing career ended.  He is known to have umpired 14 first-class matches from 1866 to 1882.  One of them was the inaugural Test match in England at The Oval in 1880. Until shortly before his death, he was coach at Uppingham School. He is buried in the town.

External sources
 CricketArchive

Further reading
 H S Altham, A History of Cricket, Volume 1 (to 1914), George Allen & Unwin, 1926
 Derek Birley, A Social History of English Cricket, Aurum, 1999
 Rowland Bowen, Cricket: A History of its Growth and Development, Eyre & Spottiswoode, 1970
 Arthur Haygarth, Scores & Biographies, Volumes 3-9 (1841-1866), Lillywhite, 1862–1867
 John Major, More Than A Game, HarperCollins, 2007

References

1833 births
1896 deaths
All-England Eleven cricketers
United South of England Eleven cricketers
English cricketers of 1826 to 1863
English cricketers of 1864 to 1889
English cricketers
Surrey cricketers
Players cricketers
North v South cricketers
English Test cricket umpires
People from Esher
Surrey Club cricketers
Married v Single cricketers
North of the Thames v South of the Thames cricketers
Players of the South cricketers
Players of Surrey cricketers